John C. McBride (September 16, 1908 – July 20, 1979) was an American politician who served as a member of the Wisconsin State Assembly and the Wisconsin State Senate.

Biography
McBride was born on September 16, 1908 in Milwaukee, Wisconsin. McBride went to Marquette University and received his law degree from University of Wisconsin Law School. He would become a lawyer. McBride served as a United Magistrate. He died of a heart attack on July 20, 1979, at his house in Milwaukee.

Political career
McBride was a member of the Assembly from 1939 to 1944 and of the Senate from 1945 to 1948. He was a Republican.

References

External links
The Political Graveyard

1908 births
1979 deaths
20th-century American lawyers
20th-century American politicians
Lawyers from Milwaukee
Marquette University alumni
Republican Party members of the Wisconsin State Assembly
Politicians from Milwaukee
University of Wisconsin Law School alumni
Wisconsin lawyers
Republican Party Wisconsin state senators